São Joaquim do Monte is a city located in the state of Pernambuco, Brazil. Located  at 124.6 km away from Recife, capital of the state of Pernambuco. Has an estimated (IBGE 2020) population of 21,398 inhabitants.

Geography
 State - Pernambuco
 Region - Agreste Pernambucano
 Boundaries - Bezerros and Camocim de São Félix   (N);  Cupira    (S);  Bonito and Belém de Maria   (E);   Agrestina    (W).
 Area - 242.63 km2
 Elevation - 463 m
 Hydrography - Sirinhaém and Una rivers
 Vegetation - Caatinga hipoxerófila
 Climate - Hot and humid
 Annual average temperature - 22.7 c
 Distance to Recife - 124.6 km

Economy
The main economic activities in São Joaquim do Monte are based in commerce and agribusiness, especially tomatoes, manioc, passion fruits; and livestock such as cattle, pigs and poultry.

Economic indicators

Economy by Sector
2006

Health indicators

References

Municipalities in Pernambuco